György Garics (born 8 March 1984) is a former professional footballer who played as a full-back. Born in Hungary, he made 41 appearances for the Austria national team scoring twice.

Football career
Born in Szombathely, Hungary, of Croatian descent, Garics moved to Vienna when he was 14 years old and started his football career in Austria with prominent side Rapid Vienna in 2002; during his first season as a teenager he made two appearances.

By the 2004–05 season the young attacking wingback has become more of a prominent member in the first team and Rapid Vienna won the Austrian Bundesliga. Around this time he also became captain of the Austria under-21 national team.

Having made 81 appearances for Rapid Vienna and scored one goal, he was bought by Italian side Napoli for €500,000, making his debut against Triestina on 23 September 2006. Soon after, he achieved a call up on 6 October 2006 for the Austria national team against Liechtenstein and scored on his international debut.

He was also called up to the Euro 2008 squad and started Austria's third match against Germany in Vienna.

The case of Garics divided Hungarian public sentiment, as it is the first high-profile case of a player choosing a national team other than Hungary, and is also considered a failure on the part of the Hungarian Football Federation to consider to select him in time for the national team.

Garics signed for Atalanta from Napoli in a co-ownership deal in early July 2008, for €1.5 million. Atalanta bought full ownership of the player for €1 million on 26 June 2009.

After Atalanta were relegated from Serie A, Garics was sold outright to Bologna on 9 August 2010, for €3 million. Garics was seriously injured in 2011, and had to miss most of the spring season at Bologna.

On 14 August 2015, Garics joined newly promoted Bundesliga club SV Darmstadt 98 on a two-year deal. He left the club on 30 August 2016.

Honours
Rapid Vienna
 Austrian Bundesliga: 2004–05

References

External links
 
 Rapid stats – Rapid archiv 
 Player profile – Euro 2008
 

1984 births
Living people
Naturalised citizens of Austria
Hungarian emigrants to Austria
Austrian people of Croatian descent
Hungarian people of Croatian descent
Burgenland Croats
Sportspeople from Szombathely
Austrian footballers
Association football fullbacks
Austria under-21 international footballers
Austria international footballers
Hungarian footballers
UEFA Euro 2008 players
UEFA Euro 2016 players
Austrian Football Bundesliga players
Serie A players
Serie B players
Serie D players
Bundesliga players
SK Rapid Wien players
S.S.C. Napoli players
Atalanta B.C. players
Bologna F.C. 1909 players
SV Darmstadt 98 players
Imolese Calcio 1919 players
Austrian expatriate footballers
Expatriate footballers in Austria
Austrian expatriate sportspeople in Italy
Expatriate footballers in Italy
Austrian expatriate sportspeople in Germany
Expatriate footballers in Germany
Hungarian expatriate footballers
Hungarian expatriate sportspeople in Austria